Solidago vossii is a flowering plant in the family Asteraceae known as Voss's goldenrod. It is endemic to Michigan in the United States. It was first formally named in 2010 by James Scott Pringle & Pamela J. Laureto. The type locality is from Howe's Lake, west of Grayling in Crawford County. It is closely related to Solidago houghtonii.

References

vossii
Flora of Michigan
Plants described in 2010
Flora without expected TNC conservation status